The Northwest Railway Museum (NRM) is a railroad museum in Snoqualmie, King County, Washington. It incorporates a heritage railway, historic depot, exhibit hall, library, and collection care center, and serves more than 130,000 visitors per year.

The heritage railway incorporates five miles of the line constructed in 1889 by the Seattle, Lake Shore and Eastern Railway (SLS&E), which was Seattle's response to the Northern Pacific's selecting Tacoma as their terminus. The SLS&E was later absorbed by the Northern Pacific.

Snoqualmie depot
The Snoqualmie depot was built in 1890 by the SLS&E. The Snoqualmie Station represents a type of building that once was in every community of any size across the nation. Good architecture was good advertising and enhanced company pride. The station once served as the terminal for this early recreation area. An atypical design created as a rural combined freight-passenger depot with lavish decorations to reflect the holiday spirit of the vacationers. Visitors came to enjoy hunting and fishing as well as Sunday excursions to Snoqualmie Falls.

A bay window on the track side is the station office. The semicircular north end stands out in this design. The eaves are supported by wooden pillars and diagonal braces and scroll work decorates the intersection of the braces with the eaves and the pillars.
The current structure was modified from the original, in which the bay window continued up through the roof and formed an octagonal tower a full story in height. A two sash window with a semicircular upper sash appeared on each face of the tower and a prominent cornice separated the tower body from the steeply pitched roof. The roof was decorated with fancy butt shingles and capped with a finial. A large swept dormer was placed in the southern part of the main structure above the freight section, Cast iron cresting and fancy butt shingles decorated the roof of both the main body and the transverse dormer. The freight dock, was wider originally and ran the length of the entire rear third of the station, is now a small porch in front of a single sliding freight door.

The Snoqualmie depot is listed on the National Register of Historic Places, ID #74001963.

Museum
The Northwest Railway Museum was founded in 1957 as the Puget Sound Railway Historical Association and took its current name in September 1999. The mission of the organization is to develop and operate an outstanding railway museum where the public can see and understand the role of railroads in the development of the Pacific Northwest, and experience the excitement of a working railroad.

The museum's collection also includes a variety of railway cars and locomotives that document that development of the railway in Washington from the 1880s through the 1960s, including the Messenger of Peace Chapel Car which is listed on the National Register of Historic Places. It also includes a 3,000-volume library and archives that focus on the history of railroads in the Northwest, and on technical and other engineering aspects of railroading.

Collection

Steam locomotives

Diesel locomotives

Gasoline-Mechanical locomotives

Coaches 
The Northwest Railway Museum maintains 17 passenger coaches of various time periods, manufactured between 1881 and 1952. Most of these cars were built by either Barney and Smith, the St. Louis Car Company, or Pullman. Some of the Spokane, Portland, and Seattle Railway coaches operate with one or both of the museum's 2 RS-4-TCs and/or Northern Pacific 924 for use on the Snoqualmie Valley Railroad.

Freight cars, industrial, and maintenance of way 
The museum owns a total of 39 other railway equipment artifacts in various forms, previously operating for a wide variety of railroads.

Heritage railroad

The Northwest Railway Museum also operates a heritage railroad called the Snoqualmie Valley Railroad. This  common carrier railroad allows museum visitors to experience a train excursion aboard antique railroad coaches through the Upper Snoqualmie Valley. Trains operate on Saturdays and Sundays from April through October and in December, and carry over 47,000 passengers per year. It also has a Day out with Thomas event every July.

Restoration Center
In August 2006 the Museum dedicated the new Conservation and Restoration Center (CRC), phase one of the Railway History Center. The CRC is a place to perform collection care on large rail artifacts including locomotives, coaches, and freight cars. It features , two full length inspection pits, and is used to perform many functions once conducted in railroad backshops.

See also

List of heritage railroads in the United States

References

Alexander, Edwin P. Down at the Depot. New York: Clarkson N. Potter, Inc. ,1970.
Droege, John A. Passenger Terminals and Trains . New York: McGraw Hill, 1916

External links

Northwest Railway Museum website
 Northwest Railway Museum blog
 WASteam
KCTV Spot 

Buildings and structures completed in 1889
Railroad museums in Washington (state)
Heritage railroads in Washington (state)
Railway stations in the United States opened in 1890
Railway stations on the National Register of Historic Places in Washington (state)
National Register of Historic Places in King County, Washington
Former Northern Pacific Railway stations in Washington (state)
Victorian architecture in Washington (state)
Museums in King County, Washington
Articles containing video clips